Vassendgutane is a Norwegian country and danseband that have defined their own genre, 'party-country', a combination of the two.

The band was formed in Ørsta in 1996, and have since released seven albums and two DVDs.

Members
Sindre Aam – vocals, bass and lyrics
Arthur Johan Bjørdal – vocals, guitar and lyrics
Rune S. Brautaset – guitar, vocals and lyrics
Ernst O. Brune – accordion
Alf Rune Melby – steel
Frank Willy Utgård – electric guitar
Kim Erik Lillestøl – drums
Source:

Discography

Albums

Singles & Ep's
2001: "Køyr mej ned te vik"
2009: "Diggy liggy lo"
2012: "Stein, torv og grus"
2013: "Ho va so fine/Bygdis"
2017: "Hjertestartar og statoilkopp"
2017: "Køyr mej heimatt"
2018: "MeToo"
2019: "Skalldyrfest"
2019: "Sånn so det va før"
2020: "Hurragutt"
2021: "Longt Inne I En Fjord"
2022: "Skrekkraude Rapala"

DVD
2006: Vassendgutane LIVE! Rockefeller
2009: Vassendgutane LIVE! Treungen

References

Norwegian musical groups
People from Ørsta